Ballyboy is a townland in County Westmeath, Ireland.

Ballyboy is one of 8 townlands of the civil parish of Portloman in the barony of Corkaree in the Province of Leinster. The neighbouring townlands are: Lugnagullagh to the north, Ballard to the east, Walshestown North to the south–east, Slane More to the south–west and Slane Beg to the west.

In the 1911 census of Ireland there were 2 houses and 10 inhabitants in the townland.

References

External links
Map of Ballyboy at openstreetmap.org
Ballyboy at The IreAtlas Townland Data Base
Ballyboy at Townlands.ie
Ballyboy at the Placenames Database of Ireland

Townlands of County Westmeath